Starksia guttata, the spotted blenny, is a species of labrisomid blenny native to the Caribbean Sea and the Atlantic Ocean from the Grenadines to Curaçao and Trinidad.  This species is a reef inhabitant.  It can reach a length of  SL.

References

guttata
Fish described in 1931